Center Lisle (also Centre Lisle, Yorkshire) is a hamlet in the town of Lisle in Broome County, New York, United States.

Notable person
John H. Jones, Wisconsin State Senator and lawyer, was born in Center Lisle.

Notes

Hamlets in New York (state)
Hamlets in Broome County, New York